Southside is the debut album by Scottish rock band Texas. It was released on 13 March 1989. It peaked at no. 3 in the UK Albums Chart and within three weeks of release was certified Gold by the British Phonographic Industry for sales in excess of 100,000 copies. Worldwide, Southside has sold over 2 million copies.

Background and release
The album's first single "I Don't Want a Lover" was released on 23 January 1989 and peaked at no. 8 in the UK Singles Chart. Following the release of the album in March of that year, which entered the UK Albums Chart at no.3, further singles from the album were less successful. The second single, "Thrill Has Gone", peaked at no. 60, while a third single, "Everyday Now", fared little better at no. 44. Despite this, a fourth single, "Prayer for You", was released on 13 November but stalled at no. 73 in the UK. Despite only one hit single, the album spent 29 weeks on the charts.

The album cover art was derived from the poster art for the film Paris, Texas, which inspired the band's name.

Critical reception
The Los Angeles Times wrote that the album's strengths "revolve around the way the Scottish quartet fuses some of rock’s most appealing elements: the lonesome, sensual slide-guitar sound of Ry Cooder ... and vocals by Sharleen Spiteri that recall the liberating spirit and convincing character of the Pretenders’ Chrissie Hynde and Lone Justice’s Maria McKee."

Track listing

Charts

Weekly charts

Year-end charts

Certifications and sales

!scope="row"|Worldwide
|
|2,000,000 
|-

Personnel
Texas
 Sharleen Spiteri – vocals, guitar
 Stuart Kerr – vocals, drums
 Johnny McElhone – bass
 Ally McErlaine – guitar

Other Personnel
 Tim Palmer – producer/audio mixer

References

1989 debut albums
Texas (band) albums
Albums produced by Tim Palmer
Mercury Records albums
Vertigo Records albums